Special district may refer to:

 Certain districts of Ethiopia not part of a zone
 Special district (United States), independent, special-purpose governmental units
Special districts in Illinois
 Special districts of China

See also

Types of administrative division